Spanish Gothic architecture is the style of architecture prevalent in Spain in the Late Medieval period.

The Gothic style started in Spain as a result of Central European influence in the twelfth century when late Romanesque alternated with few expressions of pure Gothic architecture. The High Gothic arrives with all its strength via the pilgrimage route, the Way of St. James, in the thirteenth century. Some of the most pure Gothic cathedrals in Spain, closest related to the German and French Gothic, were built at this time.

In some cases the Gothic style was built and decorated with Mudéjar elements by Mudéjar craftsmen and Christian craftsmen influenced by them, creating a highly distinctive Gothic style unique to Spain and Portugal. The most important post−thirteenth-century Gothic styles in Spain are the Levantine Gothic, characterized by its structural achievements and the unification of space, and the Isabelline Gothic, under the Catholic Monarchs, that predicated a slow transition to Renaissance architecture.

Sequence of Gothic styles in Spain

The designations of styles in Spanish Gothic architecture are as follows. Dates are approximate.

 Early Gothic (12th century)
 High Gothic (13th century)
 Mudéjar Gothic (from the 13th to the 15th centuries)
 Levantino Gothic (14th century)
 Valencian Gothic (14th and 15th century)
 Catalan Gothic
 Flamboyant/Late Gothic (15th century)
 Isabelline Gothic (15th century)
 Plateresque Gothic (15th century)

Examples

Early Gothic
Cathedral of Ávila
Cathedral of Cuenca
 Cathedral of Sigüenza
Abbey of Santa María la Real de Las Huelgas in Burgos

High Gothic
Cathedral of Burgos
 Cathedral of Burgo de Osma
Cathedral of León
Cathedral of Toledo
Palace of the Kings of Navarre in Olite
San Pablo Church, Valladolid

Mudéjar Gothic
Cathedral of San Salvador, in Zaragoza
Castillo de Coca in Coca
St. Martín's Tower in Teruel

Valencian Gothic 
Valencia Cathedral
Lonja de la Seda, in Valencia
Torres de Serranos
Palace of the Borgias
Monastery of Sant Jeroni de Cotalba, in Alfauir.
Monastery of Santa María de la Valldigna, in Simat de la Valldigna.
Basilica of Santa Maria, in Alicante.
Orihuela Cathedral, in Orihuela.
Castelló Cathedral and El Fadrí, in Castellón de la Plana
Segorbe Cathedral in Segorbe.

Balearic Gothic 
La Seu (cathedral) of Palma de Mallorca

Catalan Gothic
Santa Maria del Mar of Barcelona
Barcelona Royal Shipyard
Royal Palace in Barcelona
Cathedral of Girona

Flamboyant/Late Gothic
Cathedral of Oviedo
Cathedral of Sevilla
Cathedral of Segovia
Chapel of the Condestable, Cathedral of Burgos
New Cathedral in Salamanca

Isabelline Gothic
Monastery of San Juan de los Reyes in Toledo
Royal Chapel of Granada in Granada
Colegio de San Gregorio in Valladolid
Palace of Infantado in Guadalajara
Palace of Jabalquinto in Baeza, Jaén
San Pablo Church in Valladolid

Modern Spanish Gothic
 Ace Hotel Los Angeles

Gallery

See also
 Gothic architecture
 Romanesque architecture
 Cathedral architecture of Western Europe
 gothicmed

 
Architecture in Spain